Rubí is a Mexican telenovela produced by José Alberto Castro for Televisa. It is based on a short story by Yolanda Vargas Dulché, published as a serial on the 1960s Mexican comic book Lágrimas, Risas y Amor. 

It stars Bárbara Mori, Eduardo Santamarina, Jacqueline Bracamontes and Sebastián Rulli.

Canal de las Estrellas aired Rubí from May 17 to October 22, 2004, with Apuesta por un amor replacing it. Univision broadcast Rubí from September 20, 2004 to March 7, 2005, and has named Rubí as the top telenovela of all time.

Plot
Rubí Pérez (Bárbara Mori) is a very beautiful but poor woman who is obsessed with money. She studies at an exclusive university thanks to the financial support from Cristina (Paty Diaz), her hard-working older sister.  Rubí hopes to become rich by befriending rich people. She is best friends with Maribel de la Fuente (Jacqueline Bracamontes), a kind and wealthy young woman.  Maribel has a paralyzed leg, which prevents her from having a normal social life. Rubí is actually jealous of Maribel's social status while pitying her disability.

Rubí meets Maribel's online boyfriend Héctor Ferrer (Sebastián Rulli), an architect, and his best friend Alejandro Cárdenas (Eduardo Santamarina), a doctor.  Héctor intrigues her because she knows he is very rich, and marrying a rich man has always been her ambition to leave poverty behind.  However, she finds herself falling in love with Alejandro.  Héctor and Maribel get engaged.  Rubí starts dating Alejandro, but when she finds out that he is from a middle-class background and is not rich, she dumps him, though it breaks her heart. Rubi's mother, Refugio tries to make Rubi see that money is not everything in life and that she will regret leaving Alejandro. However Rubí refuses to listen and then sets out to seduce Héctor.

Héctor quickly falls under Rubí's spell.  On Héctor and Maribel's wedding day, Héctor leaves a devastated Maribel at the altar and elopes with Rubí instead to Cancun, where they get married. Rubí finally has the lifestyle and money that she has always dreamed of, although she's disowned by her family and friends. On their wedding night Hector tries to make love to Rubi, Rubi keeps thinking about Alejandro, which makes her run out to the beach crying. Despite this, she is still in love with Alejandro, though he vows to her that he would never forgive her for what she did to Maribel. Hector was supposed to move to New York and work on an important project, but is kicked out after he dumps Maribel at the altar. Rubí also meets a tycoon named Yago Pietrasanta, who is a womanizer and Rubi starts going out with him despite being still married to Héctor and also her mother and Alejandro's objections, Rubi also gets envious of her sister Cristina's happy relationship with Maribel's ex chauffeur, Cayetano and to separate them, she has him framed of theft by slipping on him a priceless jeweled necklace, sending him to jail days before their wedding. However, Cristina soon finds that she's pregnant with Cayetano's child and tells Refugio about it, who in turn asks for Rubí's help to release him from jail, but Rubí reveals to her mother what she did to Cayetano and a disappointed and ashamed Refugio disowns Rubí and dies from a heart attack before she could tell Cristina the truth about Cayetano. Later in Refugio's funeral, Rubí is shunned and driven away by Cristina and her neighbors, who found out that she caused her mother's heart attack and also gets disowned by Cristina.

Héctor decides to travel the world with Rubí, since he is not entirely sure that she has gotten over Alejandro. They are away for three years. When they return, Rubí discovers that Alejandro is now very rich and has a new wife named Sonia (Marlene Favela) and also meets Cristina's daughter, Fernanda, whom Rubí likes due to her resemblance to her. During an argument between Rubí and Sonia on a glass bridge, the floor below Sonia shatters, and she falls through the glass and dies. When Rubí is phoning Loreto, Héctor enters his wife's room and snatches the phone away from her. He accuses Rubí of going to see Alejandro, but Rubí claims that she went to see Marco instead of Alejandro. Enraged, Héctor pushes Rubí into the bed and makes love to her after Rubí attempts to warn her husband not to do this again. That night, Rubí and Héctor end up getting naked on a bed after making love. Rubí scolds her husband for being intimate with her, but Héctor tells her that, since they are married, Rubí is going to make love to him. Héctor makes love to his wife again. Rubí comforts Alejandro after Sonia's death and seduces him once again. He and Rubí become lovers.

When he hears that Rubí was at the scene when Sonia died, he has her arrested for murder.  They seemingly hate each other now, but Rubí begins to feel love for him again when she learns that she is pregnant with his child. Because she does not want to divorce Héctor and lose her money and status, she lies and tells Héctor that the baby is his. She is released from jail, since it is ruled that Sonia's death was accidental.

Héctor overhears Rubí telling her friend Loreto (Miguel Pizarro) that the child is actually Alejandro's.  Angry and humiliated, Héctor realizes that she never loved him, so he keeps her prisoner in her own home, intending to keep her and her child with him forever and away from Alejandro. Rubí manages to escape from Héctor with help from Loreto and Genaro, and the truth about who is the father of her child finally comes out.  By now, Alejandro is aware that Maribel has been secretly in love with him and that he too has feelings for her, but he chooses to stay with Rubí for the sake of their baby.

Sometime later, Rubí saves her beloved niece Fernanda (Kristel Casteele) from being hit by a car; Rubí is hit instead and has a miscarriage. She blames Héctor for the miscarriage, since he has hit her before because of his jealousy.  Héctor tries to prove that Rubí actually lost her baby after being hit by a car, but no one believes him except for Elena (Yadhira Carrillo).  She is the assistant to the Count of Aragón and in love with Héctor. Héctor is fatally injured in a car accident and dies before he could tell Alejandro, who is performing Héctor's surgery and trying to save his life, the truth about Rubí.

Héctor left everything in his will to Rubí, much to his parents' chagrin.  However, Elena, who hates Rubí, ensures that all of Rubí's money is lost in the stock market, leaving Rubí poor again.  Alejandro is unjustly charged with intentionally letting Héctor die on the operating table and is arrested, when the actual responsible was former hospital director Bermudez who secretly sabotaged the surgery to get revenge on Alejandro for getting him fired from the hospital and sent to jail. Immediately afterwards, the suspicions are proven unfounded and the charges against him are dropped, and Bermudez is arrested, though he accidentally shoots his son Ernesto, while he was saving Elena's life.  Upon his release, Alejandro discovers exactly how Rubí lost their baby. It is also revealed that Elena is pregnant with Héctor's child, though he never knew it.

Disgusted by the all the damage that she has done, Alejandro pays Rubí a visit one last time and tells her that it is over between them:  he has chosen Maribel.  Rubí begs him not to leave her, even humiliating herself by getting down on her knees.  He leaves her and begins to walk down the stairs.  As Rubí follows him, running down the staircase while holding onto the rail and screaming that she will never let him go, she loses her grip on the rail, falls several stories down, and crashes into a glass table below.

To save her life, doctors have to amputate her leg.  When Rubí wakes up, she finds out to her horror that her leg was amputated. Even more devastating, her beautiful face is now full of scars because of multiple glass cuts. However, despite this, Rubí still doesn't regret her actions and soon escapes from the hospital.

Finding the wedding date of Alejandro and Maribel, she shows up unseen at the church. She sights a gun through a crack on a door, targeting Alejandro, but she cannot bring herself to shoot him.  She then aims at Maribel, but her sister Cristina, Maribel's maid of honor, is in the way and blocking a clean shot.  Rubí relents and hides in a corner of the churchyard, despondent.

After the wedding, her niece Fernanda wanders over to Rubí's hiding place.  Rubí shows her scarred face to Fernanda, but the little girl is not repulsed by it.  On the contrary, she feels sympathy for her favorite aunt. When Rubí asks her if she would like to continue meeting her secretly and serve as an instrument to get her revenge and ruin Alejandro's life, Fernanda happily agrees.  Rubí limps away, dressed in rags.

Eighteen years later, Fernanda (now played by Bárbara Mori) is all grown up, bearing a striking resemblance to Rubí, save for her blonde hair. She visits her aunt, who is living in a one-room flat.  After hearing that Alejandro has returned to Mexico after years of living abroad, Rubí tells Fernanda that Alejandro and Maribel have a son, and that her job will be making both Alejandro and his son fall in love with her in order to destroy Maribel's family.

Alejandro is now the director of a hospital.  One day he finds Fernanda in his office.  He is utterly shocked, mistaking her for Rubí.  She greets him without revealing her identity and by pulling him by his tie and bringing him in for what looks like a kiss.  The screen caption, The End..? then appears.

Deleted Scene
There is a deleted scene from the ending where an adult Fernanda meets up with Rubí's old friend Loreto, who has lost his fame and became poor. Fernanda tells him about her intentions of avenging her aunt, and asks him to tell her the full story of Rubí to better know how to plan her revenge, as her family refuses to talk about Rubí and he tells with full details his own version about Rubí's wrongdoings while showing Fernanda the neighborhood where she grew up, Maribel's empty mansion and Rubí and Hector's former mansion, and after Loreto finishes the story, Fernanda decides to go to get revenge on both Alejandro and Maribel.

Cast

Main 

Bárbara Mori as Rubí Pérez Ochoa / Fernanda Martínez Pérez
Eduardo Santamarina as Alejandro Cárdenas Ruiz
Jacqueline Bracamontes as Maribel de la Fuente Ortiz 
Sebastián Rulli as Héctor Ferrer Garza
Ana Martín as Refugio Ochoa Vda. de Pérez
Yadhira Carrillo as Elena Navarro

Secondary 

Josefina Echánove as Francisca “Pancha” Muñoz
Antonio Medellín as Ignacio Cárdenas 
Ana Bertha Espín as Elisa de Duarte 
José Elías Moreno as Genaro Duarte 
Olivia Bucio as Carla Ruiz de Cárdenas
Luis Gatica as Cayetano Martínez
Leonorilda Ochoa as Dolores Herrera "Doña Lola"
Roberto Vander as Arturo de la Fuente Rangel
Ofelia Cano as Victoria Gallegos 
Miguel Pizarro as Loreto Carlione
Paty Díaz as Cristina Pérez Ochoa
Arlette Pacheco as Lilia López de Duarte
Jan as Marco Rivera 
Íngrid Martz as Lorena Treviño

Recurring 

Dolores Salomón "Bodokito" as Mariquita
Roberto Sen as David Treviño 
Sergio Jurado as Lic. Millán  
José Antonio Ferral as Dr. Garduño 
María Fernanda García as Valeria 
Eduardo Rodríguez as Saúl Méndez 
Sergio Argueta as Francisco "Paco" Gómez Gallegos
Marco Méndez as Luis Duarte López 
Tania Vázquez as Sofía Cárdenas Ruiz
Hugo Macías Macotela as Isidro Roldán
Sergio Zaldívar as Gazcón 
Mariana Rountree as Ingrid Mendoza 
Nicole Vale as Natalia 'Naty' Duarte (young) 
Karen Sandoval as Natalia 'Naty' Duarte 
Kristel Casteele as Fernanda Martínez Pérez (young)
Manuel Foyo as Ernesto Bermúdez

Special participation

Carlos Cámara as Dr. José Luis Bermúdez 
Adriana Roel as Hilda Méndez 
Sergio Goyri as Yago Pietrasanta
Marlene Favela as Sonia Chavarria
Alicia Fahr as Romina
Lorena Velázquez as Mary
Gerardo Albarrán as Gabriel Almanza
Manuel Landeta as Lucio Montemayor
Manuel "Flaco" Ibáñez as Onésimo Segundo Rabozo
Lilia Aragón as Nora de Navarro

Awards and nominations

Reception
Canal de las Estrellas' October 22 finale broadcast of Rubí earned a rating of 28 points. Univision's March 7 finale broadcast of Rubí was watched by 8 million viewers.

Remake
Television
In 1968, the original story, Rubi, was produced, directed by Francisco Wagner and produced by Valentín Pimstein, starring Fanny Cano, Antonio Medellín and Carlos Fernández.

In 1970, the film version with the same name as the telenovela, Rubí, was produced, directed and adapted by Carlos Enrique Taboada, starring Irán Eory, Aldo Monti and Carlos Bracho.

In February 2010, ABS-CBN announced Televisa had given them to permit to do a Pinoy version of the series. The Pinoy adaptation stars Angelica Panganiban and Shaina Magdayao as leading women with Jake Cuenca and Diether Ocampo as their leading men. It was launched as one of the network's offerings for the 60th year celebration of Pinoy Soap Opera ("ika-60 taon ng Pinoy Soap Opera") during the Trade Launch for the 1st quarter that same year, entitled "Bagong Simula" (New Beginning) as an adaptation was made.

In January 2012, O3 produced by the permission of Televisa an Arabic version of the series titled Ruby. The Arabic adaptation stars Cyrine Abdelnour and Diamant Abou Abboud as leading women with Maxim Khalil and Ameer Karara as their leading men. It was aired on MBC1 in the Arab world and LBCI in Lebanon.

In January 2020, Univision made a remake starring Camila Sodi. This one is a remake and a sequel at the same time as it will follow events 20 years after the original ending.

Theatre
In April 2017, Brazilian artist Clei Ribeiro starred in Rubí's first theatrical version under the name Diamante. Being a male version. Clei Ribeiro himself stands out for having similar eyebrows to Barbara Mori's, and for the beauty he has.

References

External links
 

2004 telenovelas
Female characters in comics
Mexican comics titles
Mexican comics adapted into films
Television shows based on comics
Mexican telenovelas
Spanish-language telenovelas
Televisa telenovelas
2004 Mexican television series debuts
2004 Mexican television series endings